The Federation of Enterprises in Belgium (VBO, FEB) is the only Belgian non-profit organization representing companies in all three regions of Belgium. Its members, the different Belgian sectorial employers' organizations, represent companies in key industrial and service sectors. All in all, it represents more than 30,000 businesses, of which 25,000 are small or medium-sized enterprises. Since May 2012, Pieter Timmermans is CEO of the Federation of Belgian Enterprises, and since March 2017, Bernard Gilliot of Tractebel is the President.

The VBO/FEB aims to help create jobs for the future and ensure that these jobs complement each other, especially in the service, industrial and construction sectors. In terms of jobs, the VBO/FEB represents approximately 1.5 million workers in the private sector.

History
It was founded in 1973 after a merger of the Federation of Belgian Industries and the Federation of Non Industrial Enterprises of Belgium. The VBO/FEB is the voice of business in Belgium. It aims to: work towards creating an optimum business environment, promote business interests at federal, European and international level (in 150 bodies) and to ensure consistency in the message entrepreneurs deliver and the actions they take.

Regional federations
 BECI (Brussels Enterprises Commerce and Industry)
 VOKA (Vlaams Economisch Verbond)
 Walloon Union of Companies (UWE)

See also
 Agoria
 Cercle de Lorraine
 Cercle Gaulois
 De Warande (Club)
 Economy of Belgium
 European Business Summit
 Fedustria
 League of Christian Employers (VKW)
 Mouvement des Entreprises de France
 Prince Albert Fund
 Science and technology in Belgium
 Union of Industrial and Employers' Confederations of Europe
 UNIZO

External links
 

Labour in Belgium
Trade associations based in Belgium
Economy of Belgium
Employers' organizations
Organizations established in 1973